Chapaqan (also Romanized as Chapaqān; also known as Chayaqān) is a village in Qarah Su Rural District, Meshgin-e Sharqi District, Meshgin Shahr County, Ardabil Province, Iran. At the 2006 census, its population was 447, in 99 families.

References 

Tageo

Towns and villages in Meshgin Shahr County